Generation (stylized as Genera+ion) is an American dramedy television series that premiered on HBO Max on March 11, 2021. In September 2021, the series was canceled after one season.

Premise
Featuring an ensemble cast, the story centers on a group of high school students in Orange County, California who explore their sexuality in a modern world. This tests their deeply entrenched beliefs about life, love and the nature of family in their conservative community.

Cast

Main

 Nathanya Alexander as Arianna, the rich, foul-mouthed best friend of Naomi who hides her insecurities with bigoted jokes
 Chloe East as Naomi, Nathan's careless twin sister
 Nava Mau as Ana, Greta's aunt, who is taking care of her and her brother
 Lukita Maxwell as Delilah, Arianna and Naomi's activist friend
 Haley Sanchez as Greta, a shy lesbian with a crush on Riley
 Uly Schlesinger as Nathan, Naomi's neurotic twin brother who begins to explore his bisexuality
 Nathan Stewart-Jarrett as Sam, the school's new guidance counsellor who forms a bond with Chester
 Chase Sui Wonders as Riley, a popular student and budding photographer who is best friends with Nathan.
 Justice Smith as Chester, a confident, openly gay student
 Martha Plimpton as Megan, Naomi and Nathan's highly-strung, conservative mother

Recurring
 Sam Trammell as Mark, Megan's husband and Naomi and Nathan's father
 Anthony Keyvan as Pablo, a bad boy and Riley's ex-hookup who works at the aquarium
 J. August Richards as Joe, one of Arianna's fathers
 John Ross Bowie as Patrick, one of Arianna's fathers and a former evangelical
 Mary Birdsong as Mrs. Culpepper, the overly earnest head faculty member of the GSA
 Patricia De Leon as Sela, Greta's mother
 Sydney Mae Diaz as J, a bisexual stoner and philosopher who is friends with Chester
 Alicia Coppola as Carol, Riley's suburban, meddling mother
 Marwan Salama as Bo, an under-the-radar student
 Marisela Zumbado as Lucia, a confident, lesbian student
 Diego Josef as Cooper

Guest
 Tessa Albertson as Natalia, Naomi and Nathan's older sister
 Rachel Stubington as April

Episodes

Production

Development
Generation was first announced in September 2019 with a pilot order. The pilot is written by Daniel Barnz and his daughter Zelda Barnz. Daniel Barnz also directed the pilot. In December 2019, the series was officially ordered to series. The series is created by Daniel Barnz and Zelda Barnz. Executive producers include Daniel, Zelda, Ben Barnz (who is Daniel's husband and Zelda's other father), Jenni Konner and Lena Dunham. Production companies involved with the series were slated to consist of Good Thing Going Productions, We're Not Brothers Productions and, I Am Jenni Konner Productions. On September 14, 2021, HBO Max canceled the series after one season.

Casting
In September 2019, Martha Plimpton, Justice Smith, Chloe East, Michael Johnston as Ollie, Nava Mau, Haley Sanchez, Uly Schlesinger, Nathanya Alexander as Arianna, Lukita Maxwell and Chase Sui Wonders were cast to star while Sam Trammell joined the cast in a recurring role that same month. In August 2020, Nathan Stewart-Jarrett was added to the main cast. In October 2020, Anthony Keyvan, Diego Josef, J. August Richards, John Ross Bowie, Mary Birdsong, Patricia De Leon, and Sydney Mae Diaz were cast in recurring roles. In December 2020, Alicia Coppola, Marwan Salama, and Marisela Zumbado joined the cast in recurring roles.

Filming
Filming for the pilot began at South Pasadena High School in September 2019. The series continued filming at the location during the COVID-19 pandemic.

Release
The series premiered on March 11, 2021 with the first 3 episodes available immediately. The season was divided into two 8-episode parts, with the first part ending on April 1, and the second one premiering on June 17 the same year.

On August 17, 2022, it was announced that HBO Max would be removing several series, including Generation.

The series became available on Tubi on February 1, 2023.

Reception

Reviewing the series for Rolling Stone, Alan Sepinwall gave a rating of 3/5 and said, "Generation arrives at a moment when TV has no shortage of shows about, as Megan sarcastically describes it, 'this secret life of teenagers' hoo-hah.' It's lighter than some of its peers, but still self-conscious... Still, there's promise here." Saloni Gajjar of The A.V. Club gave the series a B- and wrote, "once these teens start interacting with one another in a much more grounded manner, Genera+ion strengths emerge, as it dives meaningfully into serious issues meaningfully without getting too dark."

On Rotten Tomatoes, the series holds an approval rating of 74% based on 27 critic reviews, with an average rating of 6/10. The website's critics consensus reads, "Genera+ion salacious flourishes can feel more try-hard than authentic, but this inclusive portrayal of Gen Z shines when it identifies the universal pains of being a teenager." Metacritic gave the series a weighted average score of 60 out of 100 based on 12 critics, indicating "mixed or average reviews".

References

External links
 

2020s American comedy-drama television series
2020s American high school television series
2020s American LGBT-related comedy television series
2020s American LGBT-related drama television series
2020s American teen drama television series
2021 American television series debuts
2021 American television series endings
English-language television shows
HBO Max original programming
Teenage pregnancy in television
Television series about teenagers
Gay-related television shows
Television shows set in Orange County, California
Television shows filmed in California
Bisexuality-related television series